Gladiolus communis, the eastern gladiolus, or common corn-flag, is a species of flowering plant in the family Iridaceae, native to temperate northern Africa, western Asia and southern Europe, from the Mediterranean to the Caucasus, and widely naturalised in frost-free locations elsewhere – such as coastal parts of the southwestern British Isles.

Two subspecies are identified:
G. communis subsp. communis
G. communis subsp. byzantinus (Mill.) A. P. Ham.
In cultivation the latter has gained the Royal Horticultural Society's Award of Garden Merit.

References

communis
Plants described in 1753
Taxa named by Carl Linnaeus
Flora of Malta